Howard Madison Parshley (7 August 1884 in Hallowell, Maine – 19 May 1953) was an American zoologist, a specialist on the Heteroptera who also wrote more broadly on genetics, reproduction and human sexuality. He was responsible for translating The Second Sex into English.

Life
The son of a Baptist minister, Parshley was educated at Harvard University. From 1911 to 1914 he taught zoology at the University of Maine. In 1917, Parshley became assistant professor of zoology at Smith College, where he would stay until 1952. In 1949 he was asked to translate Simone de Beauvoir's Le Deuxième Sexe. Despite a minor heart attack in 1952, Parshley completed this task; his translation, published in 1953, has subsequently been criticized for inaccuracies and excisions.

Works
A bibliography of the North American Hemiptera-Heteroptera, 1925
(ed.) General catalogue of the Hemiptera, 1927
Science and Good Behavior, 1928
The Science of Human Reproduction: Biological aspects of Sex, 1933
Biology, 1940
(transl.) The Second Sex, 1953

References

External links

Parshley, H. M. (Howard Madison), 1884–1953 at the Smith College Archives, Smith College Special Collections

1884 births
1953 deaths
20th-century American zoologists
French–English translators
Simone de Beauvoir
American entomologists
People from Hallowell, Maine
Harvard University alumni
20th-century translators